Kent Cheung Kin Tat (born 24 November 1992) is a Hong Kong swimmer. He competed in the men's 100 metre freestyle event at the 2017 World Aquatics Championships. In 2018, he represented Hong Kong at the 2018 Asian Games held in Jakarta, Indonesia.

References

1992 births
Living people
Hong Kong male freestyle swimmers
Place of birth missing (living people)
Asian Games medalists in swimming
Swimmers at the 2014 Asian Games
Swimmers at the 2018 Asian Games
Medalists at the 2014 Asian Games
Asian Games bronze medalists for Hong Kong
21st-century Hong Kong people